Sphagnum centrale is a species of moss belonging to the family Sphagnaceae.

It has cosmopolitan distribution. It is often found in cedar swamps and similar environs. It has a pale green color common to all the Sphagnum subgenus mosses but, unlike other common members of the subgenus like Sphagnum magellanicum, it will never be red and rarely brown.

References

Flora of Bulgaria
centrale